Ludvík Bohman (born 17 March 1973) is a former Czech sprinter.

At the 1998 European Athletics Championships he was eliminated in the heats of the 100 metres and the 4 × 100 metres relay.

His father is sprinter Luděk Bohman and his brother bobsledder Martin Bohman.

Personal bests 

 100 metres: 10.54 s, Jablonec nad Nisou, 29 August 1998 
 200 metres: 21.27 s, Ostrava, 23 May 1998

References

External links 

 

1973 births
Living people
Czech male sprinters